The Jungang Expressway Branch is an expressway in South Korea. It connects Gimhae to Yangsan of South Gyeongsang Province. The expressway's route number is 551.

It link Namhae Expressway(Gimhae) and Gyeongbu Expressway(Yangsan). and doesn't have any Service Area.

History

Information

Lanes 
Gimhae JCT ~ Daedong JCT : 4 Lanes
Daedong JCT ~ Yangsan JCT : 6 Lanes

Lengths

Speed limit

List of facilities 

 IC: Interchange, JC: Junction, SA: Service Area, TG:Tollgate

See also
Jungang Expressway
Expressways in South Korea
Transport in South Korea

Expressways in South Korea
Transport in South Gyeongsang Province
Roads in South Gyeongsang